Island in the Sea is the 35th studio album by country singer Willie Nelson. The album contains two singles: the title track and "Nobody There but Me", which respectively reached No. 27 and No. 82 on the Hot Country Songs charts.

The book Willie Nelson: The Outlaw cites the album as "a laid-back slice of old-time textures, including Hawaiian music, yodeling, folk, and country, with four overproduced tracks by Booker T. Jones tacked on at the end."

Track listing
"Island in the Sea" (W. Nelson) - 2:19
"Wake Me When It's Over" (W. Nelson) - 3:17
"Little Things" (W. Nelson, Shirley Collie Nelson) - 4:23
"The Last Thing on My Mind" (Tom Paxton) - 5:17
"There Is No Easy Way (But There Is a Way)" (W. Nelson) - 2:32
"Nobody There But Me" (Bruce Hornsby, John Hornsby, Charlie Haden) - 2:47
"Cold November Wind" (Phyllis Horne) - 4:18
"Women Who Love Too Much" (Booker T. Jones, Waylon Jennings) - 4:45
"All in the Name of Love" (Jones, Jennings) - 4:59
"Sky Train" (Jones, Jennings) - 2:39

Personnel
Compiled from Island in the Sea liner notes.
Musicians
Willie Nelson - guitar, vocals
Paul English - drums
Mickey Raphael - harmonica
Bee Spears - bass guitar
Bobbie Nelson - piano
Grady Martin - guitar
Jody Payne - guitar, vocals
Billy English - percussion
Chip Young - acoustic guitar
Mike Leech - bass guitar
David Briggs - keyboards
Pete Wade - electric guitar
Martin Parker - drums
Bobby Ogdin - piano
Farrell Morris - percussion, vibes
Booker T. Jones - drums, keyboards, acoustic guitar, bass guitar

On "Nobody There but Me"
Bruce Hornsby - piano, synthesizer
Peter Harris - guitar
George Marinelli, Jr. - guitar
John Mollo - drums
Joe Puerta - bass guitar

Technical
Bobby Arnold - engineering
Larry Greenhill - engineering
Booker T. Jones - production (tracks 8-10), engineering
Grady Martin - production (track 7)
Willie Nelson - production (tracks 1-6)
Denny Purcell - mastering
Glenn Rieuf - engineering
Chip Young - engineering

Chart performance

References

1987 albums
Willie Nelson albums
Albums produced by Booker T. Jones
Columbia Records albums